Kohn v. McNulta, 147 U.S. 238 (1893), was a United States Supreme Court case in which the Court held that a person should not receive compensation for injuries sustained when he is experienced in his work and there is no evidence of negligence or extenuating circumstances.

Background 
Kohn began working as a switchman for McNulta, the receiver (buyer) of the Wabash, St. Louis and Pacific Railway Company on April 29, 1887.  On July 11, Kohn’s arm was crushed while trying to couple two freight cars in the Toledo, Ohio railyard.

Kohn filed his petition of intervention in the Circuit Court for the Northern District of Ohio, the court which had appointed McNulta the receiver. At first, his intervening petition was referred to a master, but afterward, on his motion, the order of reference was set aside and a jury called in. The court left to the jury the single question of the amount of damages that the intervenor should recover if entitled to recover anything. The jury responded $10,000. The court found that no cause of action was made out against the receiver, set aside the verdict of the jury, and dismissed the petition. The intervenor appealed to the Supreme Court.

Opinion of the Court 
The Court held that a person should not receive compensation for injuries sustained when he is experienced in his work and there is no evidence of negligence or extenuating circumstances. Kohn had argued that the Company was negligent in exposing Kohn to cars that were different from the ones he was used to handling.  The Court disagreed, reasoning that he was a mature and experienced man who should have been able to cope with the existing conditions.  The train cars were not in defective in any way, they had the double deadwoods or bumpers of unusual length and were constructed differently, but this should have been obvious even at a passing glance. Kohn had already been working there for two months, long enough to know the risks.

See also 
 List of United States Supreme Court cases, volume 147
 Lavender v. Kurn
 Wabash, St. Louis & Pacific Railway Company v. Illinois

External links 
 

1893 in United States case law
United States Supreme Court cases
United States Supreme Court cases of the Fuller Court
Wabash Railroad
History of Toledo, Ohio
Railway safety
Workers' compensation
United States labor case law